In computing, lightweight software also called lightweight program and lightweight application, is a computer program that is designed to have a small memory footprint (RAM usage) and low CPU usage, overall a low usage of system resources . To achieve this, the software should avoid software bloat and code bloat and try to find the best algorithm efficiency.

See also 
 Software optimization
 Application footprint
 Light-weight process
 Lightweight protocol
 Lightweight Procedure Call
 Lightweight programming language
 Lightweight markup language
 Load (computing)

References 

Software optimization